Widdecombe, Widecombe, Widdicombe or Widdicomb could refer to:
Ann Widdecombe (born 1947), British politician
Angus Widdicombe (born 1994), Australian rower
Danny Widdicombe, Australian musician
David Widdicombe (born 1962), Canadian filmmaker and playwright
Josh Widdicombe (born 1983), English stand-up comedian
Timothy Widdicombe (born 1990), Australian rower
Widecombe Fair, an annual event in England
Widecombe Fair (song), a folk song
Widecombe in the Moor, a Devon village
Widdicomb Furniture Company

See also
 Widikum people